Andrea Gámiz and Paula Ormaechea were the defending champions, but Ormaechea chose not to participate. Gámiz partnered up with Adriana Pérez and successfully defended her title, the pair defeating Julia Cohen and Andrea Koch-Benvenuto in the final, 6–3, 6–4.

Seeds

Draw

References 
 Main Draw

Open Seguros Bolivar - Doubles
2011 WD